Victoria Regional Airport  is a county-owned, public-use airport located five nautical miles (6 mi, 9 km) northeast of the central business district of Victoria, a city in Victoria County, Texas, United States. It is mostly used for military and general aviation, but is also served by one commercial airline with this scheduled passenger service being subsidized by the federal Essential Air Service (EAS) program.

History

World War II

Foster Field began as a United States Army Air Forces (USAAF) facility that was established in 1941 as an advanced single-engine flying school for fighter pilots.  Originally known as Victoria Field, it was renamed in 1942 in memory of 1st Lt Arthur L. Foster, a United States Army Air Corps instructor killed in a crash at Brooks Field in 1925. Foster's son received his training and commission at the base in the spring of 1942.

After World War II, Foster Field was deactivated and the site was returned to its private owners, the Buhler and Braman estates. It was later reactivated as Foster Air Force Base, a U.S. Air Force installation of the Tactical Air Command (TAC) from 1951 to 1958, during which time it operated F-86 Sabre and F-100 Super Sabre fighter aircraft and served as Headquarters for 19th Air Force (19 AF).  The base closed in December 1958 and formally inactivated in January 1959.

Post-military use
The local economy suffered greatly from the closure of Foster AFB. In the summer of 1960, the General Services Administration approved the exchange of Aloe Field for Foster Field, and Victoria County Airport was moved to the latter site. The growth of the county airport slowly replaced the loss of Foster AFB as numerous businesses located there.

Two of the largest businesses to locate at Victoria County Airport were the Devereux Foundation, a therapeutic-education center, and Gary Aircraft, which repaired surplus C-54 Skymaster (military version of the Douglas DC-4) aircraft in 1968.

In 1976, Foster became the site of the Victoria Regional Airport, which currently provides scheduled passenger service with connections to major air carriers at Austin (AUS) and Dallas/Fort Worth (DFW).

Historical airline service

Trans-Texas Airways (TTa) and its successor Texas International Airlines served Victoria for over 20 years. In 1949, Trans-Texas was operating 21-seat Douglas DC-3 aircraft (which the airline called "Starliners") into the airport with an intrastate routing of Houston Hobby Airport - Victoria - Beeville - San Antonio - Uvalde - Eagle Pass - Carrizo Springs - Laredo - McAllen - Harlingen - Brownsville.  In the fall of 1966, Trans-Texas was operating five departures a day with DC-3 aircraft with three nonstops to Houston Hobby and two nonstops to San Antonio with direct, no change of plane DC-3 service being flown from Victoria to Dallas Love Field (DAL), Midland/Odessa, San Angelo, TX, Jackson, MS, Lake Charles, LA, Alexandria, LA, Fort Polk, LA, Lufkin, TX and Longview, TX. By August 1968, TTa was operating all flights into Victoria with 40-seat Convair 600 turboprops with nonstop service to Houston Hobby (HOU), Harlingen and McAllen as well as direct, no change of plane international service to Tampico and Veracruz in Mexico. Trans-Texas then changed its name to Texas International which in 1970 was flying 15-seat Beechcraft 99 commuter turboprops nonstop to Houston Intercontinental Airport (IAH).

Texas International then ceased all flights into Victoria with its service being replaced by Metro Airlines operating de Havilland Canada DHC-6 Twin Otter commuter turboprops to Houston Intercontinental during the 1970s and early 1980s with up to seven nonstop flights a day. Tejas Airlines, a commuter air carrier based in San Antonio, was also serving the airport in 1979.  By the mid 1980s, Metro Airlines had entered into a code sharing agreement with Eastern Air Lines in order to provide passenger feed for Eastern at Houston Intercontinental and was serving Victoria as Eastern Express with up to seven flights a day to IAH operated with Twin Otter aircraft.

By the late 1980s, Continental Airlines was operating a hub at Houston Intercontinental with service into Victoria being flown by Britt Airways operating as Continental Express with five flights every weekday to IAH being operated with 30-seat Embraer EMB-120 Brasilia propjets.  Continental Express would continue to serve the airport during the 1990s and by the end of the decade was operating 19-seat Beechcraft 1900 commuter turboprops on the route to IAH in addition to the Embraer Brasilia aircraft.  By 2007, Colgan Air flying as Continental Connection was operating two flights a day to IAH with 34-seat Saab 340B turboprops.  Continental was eventually merged into United Airlines and code sharing flights to Houston Intercontinental airport were discontinued. Sun Air Express operated scheduled passenger service to Houston Intercontinental via a two-year federal Essential Air Service (EAS) contract; however, this commuter air carrier then ceased all service between the airport and IAH on October 31, 2014.

Current airline service

Boutique Air was awarded the Essential Air Service contract for Victoria and began operations in late 2018. Service was operated on the twin engine Beechcraft King Air 350. An additional flight was added in 2019 to Dallas to allow business travelers to make day trips. Due to reliability issues with the King Air, Boutique Air requested and was granted dual aircraft authorization from the Department of Transportation to supplement the route with the highly reliable Pilatus PC-12. Boutique Air plans to phase out the King Air 350 and focus on the Pilatus PC-12.

Facilities and aircraft
It has three runways:

 13L/31R is 9,111 by 150 feet (2,777 x 46 m) with an asphalt surface
 13R/31L is 4,643 by 150 feet (1,415 x 46 m) with a concrete surface
 18/36 is 4,908 by 75 feet (1,496 x 23 m) with an asphalt surface

It also has one helipad designated H1 which measures 60 by 60 feet.

For the 12-month period ending December 31, 2019; the airport had 57,422 aircraft operations, an average of 157 per day: 80% military, 13% general aviation, and 6% air taxi. At that time there were 41 aircraft based at this airport: 71% single-engine, 17% multi-engine, 7% jet, and 5% helicopter.

Airline and destination

Statistics

See also
 Texas World War II Army Airfields
 List of airports in Texas

References

Other sources

 Essential Air Service documents (Docket OST-2005-20454) from the U.S. Department of Transportation:
 Order 2005-5-2 (May 9, 2005): selecting Colgan Air, Inc., d/b/a Continental Connection, to provide essential air service at Victoria, Texas, for a two-year period at a subsidy rate of $510,185 annually.
 Order 2007-4-8 (April 6, 2007): selecting Colgan Air, Inc., d/b/a Continental Connection, to continue providing essential air service (EAS) at Victoria consisting of 12 weekly nonstop round trips to Houston with 34-seat Saab 340B turboprop aircraft for an annual subsidy of $610,049.
 Order 2009-6-10 (June 11, 2009): re-selecting Colgan Air, Inc., d/b/a Continental Connection, to continue providing subsidized essential air service (EAS) at Victoria, TX, for the two-year period beginning July 1, 2009, at the annual subsidy rate of $1,593,922.
 Order 2011-5-7 (May 5, 2011): re-selecting Colgan Air, Inc., operating as Continental Connection, to provide essential air service (EAS) at Victoria, Texas, using 34-seat Saab 340 aircraft for a two-year period beginning July 1, 2011, through June 30, 2013 for an annual subsidy of $1,856,692.
 Ninety-Day Notice (March 8, 2012): from Colgan Airlines, Inc. of termination of Essential Air Service at Victoria, Texas
 Order 2012-3-14 (March 23, 2012: prohibits Colgan Airlines, Inc. d/b/a United Airlines Express, from terminating service at Altoona and Johnstown, PA; Victoria, TX; Staunton, VA; and Beckley, Clarksburg/Fairmont, and Morgantown, WV, for 30 days beyond the end of the 90-day notice period, i.e. July 8, 2012. We are also requesting proposals by April 25, 2012, from air carriers interested in providing replacement Essential Air Service (“EAS”) at Victoria, TX; and Staunton, VA, for a new term, with or without subsidy.

External links
 
 Aerial image as of January 1996 from USGS The National Map
 
 

Airports in Texas
Essential Air Service
Victoria, Texas
Transportation in Victoria County, Texas
Buildings and structures in Victoria County, Texas